Jaime Andrés Bassa Mercado (born 31 March 1977) is a Chilean politician and attorney. Bassa has served as the Vice President of the Constitutional Convention of Chile since 2021. A political independent, Bassa is closely associated with the left-wing Broad Front alliance.

Early life and education 
Bassa received his law degree from the Pontifical Catholic University of Chile. He later received master's degrees in law from the University of Chile and in philosophy from the University of Valparaíso. Additionally, Bassa received a doctorate in law from the University of Barcelona. As an academic, Bassa has notably served as a professor of constitutional law at the University of Valparaíso.

Bassa was heavily involved in student politics during his youth, and was generally associated with moderate and liberal politics. During his time in university, Bassa ran for a student position on the same list as Sebastián Sichel.

Political views 
During his early political career, Bassa held centrist or centre-left views. During the 2010s, his political views shifted leftward, and he embraced economic interventionist policies. Bassa has criticized economic inequality in Chile, stating that "[i]t is important to note that the wealth of this country is generated by all of us and it is not fair that it is concentrated in a few families".

Bassa is a close ally of leftist politician Gabriel Boric, and has endorsed Boric's campaign in the 2021 Chilean general election.

References 

Members of the Chilean Constitutional Convention
Chilean socialists
21st-century Chilean lawyers
Chilean politicians
Chilean scholars of constitutional law
People from Valparaíso
Pontifical Catholic University of Chile alumni
University of Chile alumni
University of Valparaíso alumni
Academic staff of the University of Valparaíso
University of Barcelona alumni
1977 births
Living people